
This is a list of aircraft in alphabetical order beginning with 'E'.

E

E & P 
(Elson & Pruitt, Flint, MI)
 E & P Special
 E-C-13 1916 Triplane Tractor

e-Go 
{e-Go Aeroplanes Limited, United Kingdom}
 e-Go

E-volo 
 E-volo VC1 
 E-volo VC2
 E-volo VC007
 E-volo VC200
 E-Volo VC Evolution 1P
 E-volo VC Evolution 2P

EAA 
(Eagle Aircraft Pty Ltd)
see: Eagle

EAA 
(Experimental Aircraft Assn, Hales Corners, WI)
 EAA Baby Ace C
 EAA Acro Sport
 EAA Biplane
 EAA Nesmith Cougar
 EAA Pober Pixie

EAC 
(Engineers Aircraft Corp, Stamford, CT)
 Engineers Aircraft Corporation EAC-1

EAC 
(Société d'Etudes Aéronautiques et Commerciales - EAC)
 EAC D.127
 EAC D.128

EADS 
 EADS Mako/High Energy Advanced Trainer
 EADS Phoenix
 EADS KC-45

EADS CASA 
 EADS CASA HC-144 Ocean Sentry

EADS PZL 
 EADS PZL Warszawa-Okecie PZL-112 Junior

EADS 3 Sigma 
 3 Sigma Nearchos

EAF 
( EAF (Greek:Εργοστάσιο Αεροπλάνων Φαλήρου - Phaliron Aircraft Factory))
see KEA

Eagle 
(Eagle Aircraft Company, Boise, ID)
 Eagle DW.1
 Eagle 220
 Eagle 300

Eagle 
(Eagle Aircraft Pty Ltd / EAA - Eagle Aircraft Australia)
 Eagle X-TS
 Eagle 150A
 Eagle 150B
 Eagle ARV System

Eagle Aviation LLC 
(Eagle Aviation LLC, Oshkosh, WI)
 Eagle EA-100

Eagle Helicopter 
 Eagle Helicopter Eagle II
 Eagle Helicopter Eagle III

Eagle R&D 
(Designer:B.J. Schramm)
 Eagle Helicycle

Eagle's Perch Inc 
(Eagle's Perch Inc, Carrollton, VA)
 Eagle's Perch
 Nolan 51-HJ

Eagles Wing Corporation 
(Normandy, TN)
 Eagles Wing Scout

Earl 
((Harry W) Earl Aviation Corp, Portland, OR)
 Earl Populaire

Early Bird Aircraft Company 
(Erie, CO)
 Early Bird Spad 13
 Early Bird Jenny

Earthstar 
 Earthstar Gull 2000
 Earthstar Laughing Gull
 Earthstar Odyssey
 Earthstar Soaring Gull
 Earthstar Thunder Gull
 Earthstar Thunder Gull J
 Earthstar Thunder Gull JT2
 Earthstar Thunder Gull Odyssey

East-Olsen 
(Clifford East & William Olsen, Muni Airport, Denver, CO)
 East-Olsen 1933 Monoplane

Eastern 
(United Eastern Aeroplane Corp, Hempstead, NY)
 Eastern Tractor Biplane
 Eastern Sportplane

Eastern Ultralights 
 Eastern Ultralights Snoop I
 Eastern Ultralights Snoop +
 Eastern Ultralights Snoop II

Eastman 
(Eastman Aircraft Corp (Beasley, Eastman, Edward S Evans, Carl B Squier), Detroit, MI)
 Eastman E-2 Sea Rover
 Eastman E-2A Sea Pirate
 Eastman E-2D Sea Pirate

Eastwood 
 Eastwood Tyro
 Eastwood Tyro Mk.II

EasyUp 
(Medford, OR)
 EasyUp Parapropter

Eaves 
(Leonard Eaves, Leroy Huff, Lloyd Pearson, Oklahoma City, OK)
 Eaves Cougar 1
 Eaves Skeeter (N1111V)
 Huff Huffaire (N1111W)
 Pearson Sugar Babe (N1111J)
 Eaves Catfish
 Eaves Sting Ray

EAY 
(Empresa Aeronáutica Ypiranga)
 EAY-101
 EAY-201 Ypiranga

Eberhardt 
(Eberhart Aeroplane & Motor Co.)
 Eberhardt SE.5E
 Eberhardt FG
 Eberhardt F2G Commanche
 Eberhardt Iroquois

Eberman 
(Gus Eberman, Geneva, IL)
 Eberman 1930 Monoplane

ECA-Fernas 
( Entreprise de construction aéronautique)
 ECA-Fernas 142

Eck 
(Ing. Robert Eck)
 Eck E.120 Dolomitenvogel
 Eck E.140 Dolomitenvogel

Ecker 
(Herman A Ecker, Syracuse, NY)
 Ecker 1911 Biplane
 Ecker 1912 Biplane
 Ecker 1914 Biplane
 Ecker Flying Boat

Eckley 
(William R Eckley, Mabel, MI)
 Eckley WJ-3

Eclipse 
(Eclipse Aviation and Eclipse Aerospace (Fdr: Vern Raburn), Albuquerque, NM)
 Eclipse ECJ
 Eclipse 400
 Eclipse 500
 Eclipse 550

Ector 
(Ector Aircraft Co, Odessa, TX)
 Ector Mountaineer (Cessna L-19 conv.)
 Ector Super Mountaineer (Cessna L-19 conv.)

Eddy 
(Paul Eddy, Findlay, OH)
 Eddy 1950 Biplane (Ryan PT-22 biplane conv.)

Eddyo 
(Ed Young, Erie, CO)
 Eddyo F-2

Edel Paragliders 
(Gwangju, South Korea)
 Edel Ace
 Edel Be All
 Edel Excel
 Edel Live
 Edel Millennium
 Edel Mountain
 Edel New
 Edel Prime Bi
 Edel Quantum

Edison 
(Thomas Alva Edison, Menlo Park, NJ)
 Edison 1910 Helicopter

Edgar Percival Aircraft 
 Edgar Percival E.P.9

Edley 
(John G Edley, Miami, FL)
 Edley C-90

Edgley 
(Edgley Aircraft Ltd.)
 Edgley EA7 Optica

Edmunds 
(Phil Edmunds, Troy, OH)
 Edmunds AOK
 Edmunds G-1 Flying Scooter

Edo 
(EDO Aircraft Corp (Fdr: Earl D Osborne), College Point, NY)
 Edo B (a.k.a. Aeromarine EO)
 Edo 1925 Monoplane (a.k.a. Aeromarine EO)
 Edo Malolo 1
 Edo Malolo 2
 Edo Malolo 3
 Edo OSE
 Edo S2E
 Edo TE
 Edo Model 142

EDRA 
(EDRA Pecas e Manutencao Ltda / EDRA Aeronautica)
 EDRA Aeronautica Paturi
 EDRA Aeronautica Super Pétrel
 EDRA Aeronautica Super Pétrel LS

Edwards 
(Edwards Common Sense Aeroplane Co, Tell City, IN)
 Edwards 1909 Aeroplane
 Edwards 1914 Hydroaeroplane

Edwards 
(James Edwards, Los Angeles, CA)
 Edwards Scout

Edwards 
((George) Sterling Edwards Aircraft Co, 1055 California St, S San Francisco, CA)
 Edwards XMBM-1

EEL 
(Entwicklung und Erprobung von Leichtflugzeugen, Putzbrunn, Germany)
 EEL ULF 1 – glider designed by Dieter Reich
 EEL ULF 2 – motor glider designed by Dieter Reich

EFF 
(Entwicklungsgemeinschaft für Flugzeugbau)
 EFF Prometheus 1
 EFF Prometheus 19
 EFF Prometheus 12
 EFF Prometheus PV

Effenheim 
(Edward & Ray Effenheim, Milwaukee, WI)
 Effenheim E-1 Special a.k.a. Hawk
 Effenheim E-2

Efremov 
(N. Efremov)
 Efremov C-1

EFW 
(Eigenössische Flugzeug Werke)
see:EKW

Egge 
(Norman C Egge, Boston, MA)
 Egge Hornet

EGHS 
(Eau Gallie High School, FL)
 EGHS Gull

Eglin 
(R T Eglin and Roy Moss, Los Angeles, CA)
 Eglin E-1

Egvoyager 
(Egvoyager srl, Martellago, Italy)
 Egvoyager Voyager 203

Egyptian General Aero Organisation (EGAO) 
 Helwan HA-300

EH Industries 
(Joint venture company formed by Agusta and Westland to manage and market EH-101)
 EH Industries EH 101
 EHI CH-148 Petrel
 EHI CH-149 Chimo

Ehmann 
(Rolf Ehmann)
 Ehmann RE 2 Doppelraab

Ehroflug 
(Ehroflug GmbH, Altneu, Switzerland)
 Ehroflug Coach II S

Eich 
(James P Eich, Alhambra, CA)
 Eich JE-2 Gyroplane

Eichenfeldt 
(E I Eichenfeldt, Minneapolis, MN)
 Eichenfeldt 1909 Biplane

Eichmann 
(Ellis Eichmann, Brownsville, TX)
 Eichmann A
 Eichmann B
 Eichmann Aerobat I
 Eichmann Aerobat II
 Eichmann Aerobat III

Ekin 
( W. H. Ekin (Engineering) Company)
 Ekin Airbuggy

Eklund 
(Torolf Eklund)
 Eklund TE-1

Ekolot 
(PPHU Ekolot, Krosno, Poland)
 Ekolot JK 01A Elf
 Ekolot JK-05L Junior
 Ekolot KR-030 Topaz

Ekonomov 
 Zhiroplan

Ekström 
(Staffan W. Ekström)
 Ekström Humlan 2

EKW 
(Eidgenoessische Konstruktionswerkstaette English: "Swiss Federal Constructions Works", also known as Eigenössische Flugzeug Werke - EFW, or as Flug + Werk)
 EKW MA-7 (Militär-Apparat - MA-7)
 EKW C-35 two-seat reconnaissance biplane
 EKW C-3600
 EKW C-3602 - two prototypes
 EKW C-3603 - pre-production series (10 built)
 C-3603-1 - main production version (148 built, at least 60 later converted to target tugs)
 C-3603-1 TR - trainer version (2 built)
 EKW C-3604 - Post-war development using Saurer YS-2 engine (13 built)
 F+W C-3605 - Turboprop version with Lycoming T53 engine (24 converted from C-3603-1)
 EKW D-3800 - licence built M.S.406H fighter
 EKW D-3801 - development of D-3800
 EKW D-3802 - licence built M.S.450/540 fighter
 EKW D-3803 - development of D-3800 with bubble canopy

El Gavilán 
(see List of aircraft (G)#Gavilán)

El-Jo 
(Donald & Galen Elser-Carlyle Jobes, Lima, OH)
 El-Jo Sportplane A-2

ELA 
(ELA Aviacion S.L., Cordoba, Spain)
 ELA 07 Cougar
 ELA 07 Agro
 ELA 07S
 ELA 08
 ELA 09 Junior
 ELA 10 Eclipse

Elbit 
(Elbit Systems, Israel)
 Elbit Hermes 90
 Elbit Hermes 450
 Elbit Hermes 900
 Elbit Skylark
 Silver Arrow Micro-V
 Silver Arrow Sniper

Eldred 
(Dewey Eldred, Willoughby, OH)
 Eldred ED-2 Flyer's Dream

Eleaume 
(René Eleaume)
 Eleaume RE.1

Electravia 
(Electravia Hélices E-Props, France)
 Electravia BL1E Electra
 Electravia MC15E Cri-Cri
 Electravia Electro Trike
 Electravia Monotrace-E

Electric Aircraft Corporation 
(Cliffside Park, NJ)
 Electric Aircraft Corporation ElectraFlyer Trike
 Electric Aircraft Corporation ElectraFlyer-C
 Electric Aircraft Corporation ElectraFlyer-X
 Electric Aircraft Corporation ElectraFlyer-ULS

Electric Ride 
(Baierbrunn, Germany)
 Electric Ride E-Bird

Electricsports 
(Electricsports GmbH, Ostrach, Germany)
 Electricsports ES-Trike
 Electricsports GS-Trike
 Electricsports Scott-e

Electroflight 
 Electroflight P1e
 Electroflight/Rolls-Royce ACCEL NXT

Elias 
(G Elias & Brother, Buffalo, NY)
 Elias AJE Air Express
 Elias Airmobile
 Elias AJE
 Elias EC-1 Aircoupe
 Elias Airsport
 Elias EC-3 Airmobile
 Elias EM-1
 Elias EM-2
 Elias ES-1 (a.k.a. Elias-Stupar Twin)
 Elias EO
 Elias M-1 Mailplane
 Elias NBS-3
 Elias Sport#1
 Elias Sport#2
 Elias Sport#3
 Elias TA-1

Elitar 
(Elitar (Samara VVV-Avia))
 Elitar Sigma
 Elitar IE-101 Elitar
 Elitar IE-201 Senator
 Elitar IE-202
 Elitar IE-203
 Elitar-202
 Elitar-401

Elixir Aircraft 
(Elixir Aircraft, France)
 Elixir Aircraft Elixir

Ellehammer 
 Ellehammer monoplane
 Ellehammer semi-biplane
 Ellehammer triplane
 Ellehammer helicopter
 Ellehammer No1
 Ellehammer No3
 Ellehammer IV 1908

Elliot 
(H E Elliot, Los Angeles, CA)
 Elliot Sport

Elliotts of Newbury 
 Elliotts Newbury Eon
 Elliotts Baby Eon
 Elliotts Olympia Eon
 Elliotts Primary Eon

Ellipse 
(La société Ellipse, Etuz-Marnay, France)
 Ellipse Alizé
 Ellipse Fuji 16 Alizé
 Ellipse Titan CX Alizé
 Ellipse DTA
 Ellipse Fuji
 Ellipse Sol'R
 Ellipse Titan
 Ellipse Twist
 Ellipse Windee
 Ellipse Zenith

Ellison-Mahon 
 Ellison-Mahon Gweduck

Elmendorf 
(Leonard C Elmendorf, Garden City, MI)
 Elmendorf Special

Elmwood Aviation 
 Elmwood CA-05 Christavia Mk.I
 Elmwood Christavia Mk.II
 Elmwood CH-8 Christavia Mk.IV

Elroy Air 
 Elroy Air Cargo

Ely 
(David Ely)
 Ely Twin

Elytroplan
See:de Rouge

Emair 
(Emair, div of Murrayair Ltd, Harlingen, TX)
(a.k.a. Agronemair)
 Emair MA-1 Paymaster
 Emair MA-1B Diablo 1200
 Emair MA-2 Paymaster

Emblem 
(Arizona Airmobile Co, Phoenix, AZ)
 Emblem Biplane 1911

Embraer 
(Empresa Brasileira de Aeronáutica S. A. English: Brazilian Aeronautics Company, Inc.)
 Embraer E-99
 Embraer E-190
 Embraer EMB 110 Bandeirante 
 Embraer EMB 111
 Embraer EMB 120 Brasilia
 Embraer EMB 121 Xingu
 Embraer EMB 123 Tapajós
 Embraer EMB 145 Erieye
 Embraer EMB 200 Ipanema
 Embraer EMB 201 Ipanema
 Embraer EMB 202 Ipanema
 Embraer EMB 326 Xavante
 Embraer EMB 312 Tucano
 Embraer EMB 314 Super Tucano
 Embraer EMB 710 Carioca (PA-28-235)
 Embraer EMB 711 Corisco (PA-28-200R)
 Embraer EMB 712 Tupi
 Embraer EMB 720 Minuano (PA-32-300)
 Embraer EMB 721 Sertanejo
 Embraer EMB 810 Sêneca (PA-34-200T)
 Embraer EMB 820 Navajo (PA-31-350)
 Embraer EMB 821 Carajá
 Embraer/FMA CBA 123 Vector
 Embraer Lineage 1000
 Embraer Legacy 450
 Embraer Lagacy 500
 Embraer Legacy 600
 Embraer Legacy 700
 Embraer Phenom 100
 Embraer Phenom 300
 Embraer Praetor 500
 Embraer Praetor 600
 Embraer E-Jet family
 Embraer E-Jet E2 family
 Embraer ERJ 135
 Embraer ERJ 140
 Embraer ERJ 145
 Embraer ERJ family
 Embraer R-99
 Embraer R-99A
 Embraer 170
 Embraer 175
 Embraer 190
 Embraer 195
 Embraer C-390
 Embraer MFT-LF

Emerald Coast Aircraft 
(Panama City, FL)
 Emerald Coast XL2 Sport

Emigh 
((Harold) Emigh Aircraft Co, Denver, CO)
 Emigh Airsport
 Emigh Commuter Jr.
 Emigh Rocket
 Emigh A-2 Trojan

Emmert 
(Don Pittman, Sapulpa, OK)
 Emmert Special

Empire State 
(Empire State Aircraft Corp, Hempstead Plains, NY)
 Empire State 1916 Military Tractor Biplane

Emsco 
((E M Smith & Associates) EMSCO Aircraft Corp, Long Beach, CA)
 Emsco B-2 Challenger
 Emsco B-3
 Emsco B-3A
 Emsco B-4
 Emsco B-5
 Emsco B-7 Sport
 Emsco B-8 Flying Wing
 Emsco B-10
 Emsco Arctic Tern

ENAER 
(Empresa Nacional de Aeronáutica de Chile English:National Aeronautic Enterprise of Chile).
 ENAER Pantera
 ENAER T-35 Pillán
 ENAER T-35T Aucán
 ENAER A-36 Halcón
 ENAER T-36 Halcón
 ENAER ECH-02 Ñamcú - original design
 ENAER Eaglet - as modified for production
 ENAER E.26 Tamiz
 ENAER Avion Livano

Endicott 
(J L Endicott Airplane Co, Medford, NY)
 Endicott 1910 Biplane

Engels 
(Yevgenii Robertovich Engels)
 Engels 1915 monoplane
 Engels MI (Morskoi Istrebitel - marine fighter)
 Engels I
 Engels II
 Engels III

Enghusen-Anderson 
(Victor Enghusen & Morris Anderson, Frontenac, MN)
 Enghusen-Anderson 1931 Monoplane

Engineering Division 
(Engr Division, McCook Field, Dayton, OH; Hampton Roads, VA)
 Engineering Division XB-1A
 Engineering Division-Pomilio BVL-12
 Engineering Division XCO-5
 Engineering Division XCO-6
 Engineering Division DH-4
 Engineering Division-Pomilio FVL-8
 Engineering Division GAX
 Engineering Division GA-1
 Engineering Division H-1
 Engineering Division M-1
 Engineering Division NBL-1
 Engineering Division TP-1
 Engineering Division TW-1
 Engineering Division USAC-1
 Engineering Division USB
 Engineering Division USD-9A
 Engineering Division VCP
 Engineering Division P-28 (McCook Field)
 Engineering Division P-68 (McCook Field)
 Engineering Division P-69 (McCook Field)
 Engineering Division P-176 (McCook Field)
 Engineering Division P-200 (McCook Field)
 Engineering Division P-263 (McCook Field)
 Engineering Division P-303 (McCook Field)
 Verville-Packard R-1

Engle 
((Richard B "Dick") Engle Aircraft Corp (a.k.a. Palmer Inventions Inc, Engel Air Products Inc, Palmer Cam Engine Mfg Co), Framingham, Natick, Boston, and Cambridge, Massachusetts)
 Engle 10 (a.k.a. Engel 1-C)
 Engle T-1 little Chief

Engle-Myers 
(Bruce Engle and Garland Myers, Burlington, IA)
 Engle-Myers Red Wing

English 
(Peter & W P English, Oakland and San Francisco, CA)
 English 1908 Helicopter

English Electric 
 English Electric Ayr
 English Electric Canberra
 English Electric Kingston
 English Electric P.1B Lightning
 English Electric P.1
 English Electric Wren

Engstrom 
(Erik Engstrom)
 Engstrom EES-1 Sky Swallow V1

Ensley 
(A Y Ensley, Livingston, CA)
 Ensley A-1

Enstrom 
 Enstrom F-28
 Enstrom T-28
 Enstrom TH-28
 Enstrom TH180
 Enstrom 280
 Enstrom 480

Entecho 
 Entecho Demipod
 Entecho Mupod

Entler 
(Victor Entler / Entler-Werke, Wilhelmshaven)
 Entler E.II

Entwicklungsring-Nord 
(Joint Venture between Weserflug, Focke-Wulf, and Hamburger Flugzeugbau; Weserflug and Focke-Wulf were later absorbed into VFW)
 Erno-61-4

Entwicklungsring-Süd 
(see #EWR)

Epic 
(Epic Air LLC / Epic Aviation )
 Epic Dynasty
 Epic LT
 Epic Elite
 Epic Escape
 Epic Victory
 Epic E1000

Epps 
(Ben T Epps, Athens, GA)
 Epps 1907 Monoplane
 Epps 1909 Monoplane
 Epps 1910 Monoplane
 Epps 1911 Monoplane
 Epps 1912 Monoplane
 Epps 1916 Biplane
 Epps 1924 Monoplane
 Epps 1930 Biplane
 Epps M-1

Equator 
(Equator Aircraft Gesellschaft fur Flugzeugbau mbH Ulm)
 Equator P-300 Equator
 Equator P-350 Equator
 Equator P-400 Equator
 Equator P-420 Turbo Equator
 Equator P-420 Twin Equator
 Equator P-450 Equator
 Equator P-550 Turbo Equator
 Equator P2 Excursion

Erasmus 
 Erasmus SA 40

Erasmus 
(C.J. Erasmus, Chicago, IL)
 Erasmus Super Parasol

ERCO 
(Engineering and Research Corporation (Pres: Henry A Berliner), Washington, DC and Riverdale, MD)
 ERCO 191-A
 ERCO 310
 Ercoupe
 Ercoupe XPQ-13
 Ercoupe O-55
 Twin Ercoupe

Erickson (aircraft constructor) 
(Erickson, Springfield, MA)
 Erickson Taft-Kingsbury

Erickson 
(T E Erickson, Minneapolis, MN)
 Erickson 1938 Monoplane

Erickson Air Crane 
(Erickson Air-Crane Inc, Central Point, Orlando, FL)
 Erickson Air Crane

Erika 
(Louis Erickson, Springfield, MA)
 Erika 1910 Biplane

Erla 
(Erla Maschinenwerk G.m.b.H. / designer Franz Xaver Mehr)
 Erla 3
 Erla Me 4 (glider)
 Erla Me 4A (motorglider) 
 Erla Me 5
 Erla Me 5A
 Erla Me 5D
 Erla Me 6
 Erla Me 6A

Ernoul 
(France)
 Ernoul-Dewoitine F.A.T.M.A.2 Commercial Monoplane

Ernst 
(Ernst Flying Machine Co, no location.)
 Ernst 1907 Aeroplane

ERPALS 
(Études et Réalisations de Protottypes pour l'Aviation Légère et Sportiv)
 ERPALS JH.03 le Courlis

ESA 
 ESA Spacelab

Escapade 
(Escapade Aircraft Limited, United Kingdom)
 Escapade Kid

Esch 
(Joseph W Esch, Akron, OH)
 Esch Special

Eshelman 
(Cheston L Eshelman Corp, Dundalk, MD)
 Eshelman EF-100 Winglet
 Eshelman Flying Flounder
 Eshelman FW-5

Eskildsen 
(Kenneth Eskildsen, Lexington, NE)
 Eskildsen Indian Chief

Esnault-Pelterie 
 Esnault-Pelterie REP.1
 Esnault-Pelterie REP.2
 Esnault-Pelterie REP.A
 Esnault-Pelterie REP.B
 Esnault-Pelterie REP.C
 Esnault-Pelterie REP.D
 Esnault-Pelterie REP.K

Espenlaub 
(Gottlob Espenlaub / Espenlaub Flugzeugbau)
 Espenlaub E-01
 Espenlaub E-02 – designer:Alexander Lippisch
 Espenlaub E-03
 Espenlaub E-04
 Espenlaub E-05
 Espenlaub E-09
 Espenlaub E-11a
 Espenlaub E-12
 Espenlaub E-14
 Espenlaub E-15
 Espenlaub E-15 Rak
 Espenlaub E-32
 Espenlaub E-33
 Espenlaub Motorsegler
 Espenlaub Rakete
 Espenlaub S
 Espenlaub Schleppflugzeug
 Espenlaub Schulflugzeug

Essig 
(Essig Aero Advertising Service, Los Angeles, CA)
 Essig Ace

ESTA 
(Ecole Spéciale des Travaux Aéronautiques / Antoine Odier & Gustave Bessière)
 ESTA Clinogyro

Estivals & Domecq 
(René Estivals & Jean Domecq)
 Estivals & Domecq ED.3

Etheredge 
(W C Etheredge, Spartanburg, SC)
 Etheredge Trainer

Ethiopian Airlines 
(Addis Ababa, Ethiopia)
 Ethiopian Airlines Eshet

Etrich 
(Igo Etrich / Etrich FlugzeugWerke (EFW), Austria)
 Etrich-Wels 1904 kite/glider
 Etrich-Wels 1906 Glider – Etrich's Leaf, 1906
 Etrich No1 1908
 Etrich Taube
 EFW Etrich Taube:Produced by the inventor Igo Etrich and EFW Etrich Flugzeugwerke.
 EFW Etrich II Taube 2-seater tractor monoplane
 EFW Etrich II modified Taube tractor monoplane
 EFW Etrich III Möve (Seagull) tractor monoplane
 EFW Etrich IV Manövertaube Type B military 2-seater monoplane
 EFW Etrich IV Taube tractor monoplane
 EFW Etrich V Taube tractor monoplane
 EFW Etrich VI Taube tractor monoplane
 EFW Etrich VII Renntaube 3-seater racing monoplane (1911)
 EFW Etrich VIII Luft-Limousine 4-seater high-wing monoplane (1911–12)
 EFW Etrich IX Schwalbe monoplane
 EFW Etrich XII Rennapparat 2-seater bomber monoplane
 EFW Etrich Taube Type 1913 2-seater bomber monoplane
 EFW Etrich Manövertaube Type F 2-seater military monoplane
 EFW Etrich Etrichapparat monoplane
 Etrich-Rumpler Taube:Initial name of the 
 Rumpler Taube
 Rumpler Delfin-Taube (Rumpler Kabinentaube Delfin) Version with a closed cabin
 Gotha Taube:Produced by the Gothaer Waggonfabrik (Land Eindecker - "Land Monoplane") and designated Gotha A.I by the Idflieg
 Gotha LE.1
 Gotha LE.2
 Gotha LE.3 
 Harlan Pfeil Taube
 Halberstadt Taube III:Produced by the Halberstadt.
 Jeannin Stahltaube:Version with a steel tubing fuselage structure.
 Kondor Taube:Produced by the Kondor.
 RFG Taube:Produced by the Reise- und Industrieflug GmbH (RFG).
 Roland Taube
 Albatros Taube:Produced by the Albatros Flugzeugwerke
 Albatros Doppeltaube:Biplane version produced by the Albatros Flugzeugwerke.
 Aviatik Taube:Produced by the Automobil und Aviatik AG firm.
 DFW Stahltaube:Version with a steel frame
 Etrich A.I
 Etrich A.II
 Etrich Luft-Limousine (1912–13)
 Etrich Sport-Taube (1929)

Etudes Andre Morin 
(Colombes, France)
 Etudes Andre Morin M 85

Euler 
(Euler-Werke / Euler Flugmaschinen-Werke)
 Euler Hydro-triplane
 Euler B.I
 Euler B.II
 Euler B.III
 Euler C
 Euler D.I
 Euler D.II
 Euler Doppeldecker 1
 Euler Doppeldecker 2
 Euler Dreidecker 1
 Euler Dreidecker 2
 Euler Dreidecker 3
 Euler Dreidecker 4
 Euler Dreidecker 5
 Euler Pusher Einsitzer (Gelber Hund - yellow hound)
 Euler Vierdecker
 Euler Military triplane
 Euler 1911 eindecker (not a Taube)
 Euler 1912 eindecker (not a Taube)

Euro-ALA 
(Euro-ALA, Italy)
 Euro-ALA Jet Fox

Eurocopter 
 Eurocopter BO 105
 Eurocopter Dauphin
 Eurocopter Cougar
 Eurocopter EC 120 Colibri
 Eurocopter EC 130 Ecureuil
 Eurocopter EC 135
 Eurocopter EC 145
 Eurocopter EC 155
 Eurocopter EC 175
 Eurocopter EC 225 Super Puma Mk.III
 Eurocopter EC 635
 Eurocopter EC 725 Cougar
 Eurocopter Dauphin
 Eurocopter Fennec
 Eurocopter HH-65 Dolphin
 Eurocopter Panther
 Eurocopter Super Puma
 Eurocopter Tiger
 Eurocopter/Kawasaki BK 117

Eurodisplay 
(Kozomín, Czech Republic)
 Eurodisplay SR-01 Magic

EuroFAR 
(European Future Advanced Rotorcraft)
 EuroFAR

Eurofighter 
 Eurofighter Typhoon

EuroFLAG 
(European Future Large Aircraft Group)
See: Airbus A400M Atlas

Eurofly 
(Eurofly srl, Galliera Veneta, Italy)
 Eurofly FB5 Star Light
 Eurofly Flash Light
 Eurofly Viper
 Eurofly Fire Cat
 Eurofly Fox
 Eurofly Basic Fox
 Eurofly Fire Fox
 Eurofly Fire Fox 2000

Europa 
 Europa Classic
 Europa XS
 Europa Motorglider
 Europa LSA
 Europa Elite

Europe Sails 
(Neukirchen, Austria)
 Europe Sails Excel
 Europe Sails Hyper
 Europe Sails Independent
 Europe Sails Special Dimensione

EuroSport 
(EuroSport Aircraft Lda)
 EuroSport Crossover

Evangel 
 Evangel 4500

Evans 
((W Samuel) Evans Aircraft, La Jolla, CA)
 Evans VP-1 Volksplane
 Evans VP-2

Evektor 
 Evektor EPOS
 Evektor EV-55 Outback
 Evektor EV-97
 Evektor SportStar
 Evektor SportStar SL
 Evektor EuroStar
 Evektor VUT100 Cobra
 Evektor Harmony LSA

Everage 
(Ira Everage, Houston TX.)
 Everage Texas Turbo

Everett 
(Marvin Everett Sr, Somerville, NJ)
 Everett Sportsman

Evers 
(W. Heinrich Evers of Lamstedt)
 Evers E.1
 Evers E.2
 NFW E.5

Everson 
(Arthur and Ernest Everson)
 Everson Evo I
 Everson Evo II
 Everson Evo III

Eviation 
(Eviation Aircraft)
 Eviation Alice

Evolution Aircraft 
(Redmond, OR)
 Lancair Evolution

Evolution Trikes 
(Zephyrhills, FL)
 Evolution Revo

EWR 
 EWR VJ 101

Excalibur 
(Excalibur Aircraft)
 Excalibur Aircraft Excalibur

Excalibur 
( Excalibur Aviation Company)
 Excalibur 800

Exkluziv 
(Exkluziv sro, Topolcany, Slovakia)
 Exkluziv Joker

Exel 
(George Exel, Clifton, NJ)
 Exel Model 100

Exosonic 
 Exosonic 1.8

Explorair 
(Ebringen, Breisgau-Hochschwarzwald, Baden-Württemberg, Germany)
 Explorair Relax MV

Explorer Aircraft 
(Explorer Aircraft - now AEA)
 Explorer Aircraft Explorer 350R
 Explorer Aircraft Explorer 500T
 Explorer Aircraft Explorer 750T

Explorer 
(Explorer Aviation, Grangeville, ID)
 Explorer Ellipse

Express 
(Express Aircraft Co (Paul Fagerstrom & Lawrence Olson), Olympia, WA)
 Express Series 90
 Express Wheeler

Express Design Inc 
 EDI Express
 EDI Loadmaster 3200

Extra 
(Extra Flugzeugbau / Extra Aerobatic Aircraft / WalterExtra)
 Extra EA-200
 Extra EA-230
 Extra EA-260
 Extra EA-300
 Extra EA-330
 Extra EA-400
 Extra EA-500
 Extra NG (Extra Aerobatic Aircraft)

Eyerly 
((Lee U) Eyerly Aircraft Corp, Eyerly School of Aeronautics, Salem, OR)
 Eyerly Sport
 Eyerly Monoplane
 Eyerly Whiffle Hen
 Eyerly-Lee Comet

References

Further reading

External links

 List of aircraft (E-H)